Bohring–Opitz syndrome (BOS) is a medical syndrome caused by a mutation in the ASXL1 gene.

Presentation

This condition is characterised by characteristic craniofacial appearance, fixed contractures of the upper limbs, abnormal posture, feeding difficulties, intellectual disability, small size at birth and failure to thrive.

Children with BOS can also have recurring respiratory infections, silent aspiration, sleep apnea, developmental delay, abnormal hair density and length, Wilms' tumors, brain abnormalities,  and other issues.

Genetics

Genetically, de novo truncating mutations in ASXL1 have been shown to account for approximately 50% of Bohring–Opitz syndrome cases.

A second gene associated with this condition is the Kelch-like family member 7 (KLHL7).

Diagnosis
As some of these features are shared with other genetic syndromes, the diagnosis is made by genetic testing.

Epidemiology

The syndrome is extremely rare, with fewer than 80 reported cases worldwide.

References

External links 

Rare genetic syndromes
Syndromes with craniofacial abnormalities
Syndromes with intellectual disability